Glenea langana is a species of beetle in the family Cerambycidae. It was described by Maurice Pic in 1903. It is found in Laos, China (Guangxi, Yunnan), Thailand and Vietnam.

References

langana
Beetles described in 1903